Nomophila brevispinalis is a moth in the family Crambidae. It was described by Eugene G. Munroe in 1973. It is found in the Democratic Republic of the Congo (Katanga), South Africa, Tanzania and Zambia.

References

Moths described in 1973
Spilomelinae